Richard Festinger (born 1 March 1948) is an American composer of contemporary classical music, pianist and educator.

Biography
Festinger was born in Newton, Massachusetts. He received his B.A. in music, magna cum laude, from San Francisco State University, and his Ph.D. in music composition from the University of California, Berkeley. He was the founding director of Earplay, a new chamber music ensemble based in the Bay Area. He has been a resident artist at the MacDowell Colony, Camargo Foundation, Cité internationale des arts in Paris, Yaddo, the Virginia Center for the Creative Arts, the Rockefeller Foundation Bellagio Study Center, the Ligurian Study Center in Bogliasco, Italy, Fundación Valparaíso, Mojácar, Almeria, Spain, Ucross Foundation Centre International d’Accueil et d’Échanges des Récollets, the Aaron Copland House, the Oberpfälzer Künstlerhaus, and the Central Conservatory of Music in Beijing. He was commissioned by the Fromm Foundation in 2003  to compose his work Hidden Spring for the Cygnus Ensemble. Also in 2003 Works and Process at the Guggenheim commissioned and premiered his settings of poet/author Denis Johnson, The Coming of Age with Amy Burton, soprano and The Group for Contemporary Music conducted by Bradley Lubman. In 2009 pianist Marilyn Nonken toured with Festinger's large scale piano solo, Le Pianiste.

Early in his career Festinger played guitar and toured with folk singer Joan Baez including a performance at Woodstock. Shortly afterwards, intent on pursuing a performing career in jazz, he attended the Berklee School of Music in Boston, where he studied composition with Herb Pomeroy and improvisation with Gary Burton. Returning to San Francisco in 1972 he performed extensively for several years as a jazz guitarist while pursuing a growing interest in classical music and composition. Festinger earned his B.A. from San Francisco State and later his M.A. and Ph.D. from the University of California, Berkeley where he worked with Andrew Imbrie. Festinger is Professor of Theory and Composition at San Francisco State University, where he is also the artistic director of the Morrison Artists Chamber Music Series.

Compositions

 Incognito (2014) text: Emily Dickinson, soprano and baritone
 Winds of May (2014) text: James Joyce, soprano and two classical guitars
 Love Wanders There (2013) text: James Joyce, soprano and two classical guitars
 Kleinen Doch Emsigen (2013) flute, clarinet, viola, cello
Portrait(2012) unaccompanied violin
 Violacanta (2012) unaccompanied viola
 Upon The Viol (2012) unaccompanied cello
 To a Pilgrim (2011) bass clarinet and cello
 Spring Ice (2010) soprano and violin, on 12th-century Japanese poems
 Enchainement (2009) for solo viola
 Le Pianiste (2009) solo piano three pieces after paintings of Roberto Matta
 Equinox (2009) for clarinet and small orchestra
 Legerdemain (2008) solo percussion, hand drums
 Insect Voices (2008) soprano and four players
 The Locust Tree (2007) chorus-SATB (text William Carlos Williams)
 Concerto for Piano and Nine Instruments (2007)
 Between Thought and Thing (2006) for eight players
 The Way Things Go (2006) flute, piano
 From The Beginning (2005) String Quartet No. 2
 A Machine for Interpreting Dreams’’ (2005) for four players
 Hidden Spring (2004) for six players
 Laws of Motion (2004) for five players
 Diary of a Journey (2003) for six players
 The Coming of Age (2003) text: Denis Johnson soprano and six players
 a dream foretold (2001) for four players 
 Construction in Metal and Wood (2001) percussion and piano
 Crossfire (2000) two percussion
 Peripeteia (1999) clarinet, violin and cello
 On the Lightness of the Moon (1998) clarinet, violin, viola and piano
 After Blue (1998) flute, clarinet, violin, cello, piano and percussion, 1998
 Dajunso Ma Dor Da Duca (1997) nine-part chorus
 Tapestries (1997) violin, cello and piano, 1997
 Windsongs (1996) flute, oboe, clarinet, bassoon, horn
 Trionometry (1996) flute, clarinet and piano, 1996
 Violuminescence (1995) violin solo and chamber orchestra, 1995
 Twinning (1994) violin and piano, 1994
 String Quartet No.1 (1994)
 A Serenade for Six (1993) flute, clarinet, violin, cello, piano and percussion
 Smokin' with Cocuswood (1992) oboe, string quartet and piano
 Head over Heels (1992) solo electronic keyboard with computer
 Three Little Piano Pieces (1992)
 Octet (1991) – flute, oboe, clarinet, horn, violin, viola, cello and piano
 Sonata for Cello and Piano (1990)
 Variations for Piano (1988)
 Septet (1987) – flute, clarinet, violin, viola, cello, piano and percussion
 Impromptu (1985) clarinet and piano
 Letters and the Weather of Six Mornings (1984) soprano and piano
 Paysages Modernes (1983) large orchestra
 Song: Beauty is a Shell from the Sea (1981) SATB with flute, oboe, bass clarinet, horn, string quartet, harp and guitar
 Concerto for Piano and Orchestra (1980)
 Triptych (1979) solo flute
 Matin (1978) CD
 Ontogenesis (1978) flute, clarinet, violin, cello and piano
 Avian Landscapes (1987) CD
 In Delirium of Sunrise (1977) string quartet
 Cheville (1976) large orchestra
 Divertimento (1976) oboe, clarinet, violin and cello
 Movements for Guitar (1976)
 Prelude for Guitar (1971)

Recordings
 Music of Richard Festinger. New Millenium Ensemble. Bridge Records 9245
 Richard Festinger: Tapestries and Other Works. Laurel Trio, Earplay, Curtis Macomber. New World/CRI NWCR832
 A Serenade for Six. New Millenium Ensemble. New World/CRI NWCR772
 Septet**, the Earplay ensemble, Centaur CD 2274
 Triptych, Samuel Baron, flute, Contemporary Recording Studios vinyl LP CRS 8738
 Various tracks, Joan Baez, One Day at a Time, Vanguard Records
 Live at Pangaea, volumes I and II, Independent Records, San Rafael, CA, vinyl LPs

Footnotes

External links
Richard Festinger bio at San Francisco State University
Official Richard Festinger website
review of Festinger CD on Bridge Records
Review at the Journal of the Society for American Music, Volume 4 – Issue 02 – 2010
Festinger page at publisher C.F. Peters

1948 births
Living people
20th-century classical composers
20th-century American composers
20th-century American male musicians
21st-century classical composers
21st-century American composers
21st-century American male musicians
American classical composers
American male classical composers
San Francisco State University faculty
University of California, Berkeley alumni